Gerard Pieter (Gerrit) Keizer (8 August 1910 – 5 December 1980), also known as Gerard Keyser, was a Dutch footballer who played as a goalkeeper. Keizer was highly successful in Holland whilst playing with AFC Ajax. He was also the original "Flying Dutchman" at English side Arsenal, whom he helped to their first league title in English football.

Club career
Keizer joined Ajax Amsterdam at the age of 16, and two years later made his debut for the side, against Stormvogels on 1 April 1929. For the first few years of his career he deputised for Ajax's No. 1 Jan de Boer. In 1930, he made a move to England.

Keizer at first played as an amateur for Kent side Margate. At the time Margate acted as a nursery club for London club Arsenal, and soon Keizer was spotted by Arsenal's manager, Herbert Chapman. Keizer was at once pitched into Arsenal's first team, and made his club debut against Blackpool on 30 August 1930. He also featured in the Gunners' 2–1 1930 Charity Shield victory over Sheffield Wednesday. He went on to play in Arsenal's first twelve First Division matches of the 1930–31 season. With the Gunners, Keizer went on to win the First Division title of 1930–31. This victory was Arsenal's first ever league title.

Keizer's playing style was distinctly flamboyant, to the point of at times erratic. With stiff competition coming from Arsenal's other keepers, Bill Harper and Charlie Preedy, Keizer lost his regular spot within the side. He thus left Arsenal in July 1931 for Charlton Athletic. Keizer later played for club Queens Park Rangers.

Keizer finally returned to Amsterdam in 1933 to become Ajax's number one keeper. He eventually played over 300 matches for Ajax, becoming a club legend. A pair of his goalkeeping boots are as so on display within Ajax's museum.

International career
Keizer was capped for the Netherlands national team on two occasions. His debut for Ons Oranje came in a qualifier against Belgium, a 4–2 win that took the Netherlands to the 1934 FIFA World Cup. However, Keizer was not picked for the squad that actually went to the tournament.

Personal life
After the war, Ajax found themselves in deep financial trouble and so were not able to afford their own kits. Keizer flew to London to ask his old club Arsenal for help, who obligingly donated a set of kits and footballs.

Ajax thus played some matches in Arsenal's red and white shirts. Keizer continued to repeatedly journey across the Channel, but in 1947, he was discovered to be smuggling British banknotes within leather footballs; he was fined 30,000 guilders and sentenced to six months imprisonment.

Afterwards, Keizer went into business and became one of Amsterdam's leading greengrocers. In 1955, he returned to Ajax, this time as a member of the club's board. He died in 1980, aged 70.

Honours
Arsenal
Charity Shield: 1930
First Division: 1930–31

References

External links
 

1910 births
1980 deaths
Dutch footballers
Dutch expatriate footballers
Netherlands international footballers
Expatriate footballers in England
Dutch expatriate sportspeople in England
Association football goalkeepers
Arsenal F.C. players
Charlton Athletic F.C. players
Queens Park Rangers F.C. players
Margate F.C. players
AFC Ajax players
Footballers from Amsterdam